The 2003 Wales rugby union tour of Australasia was a series of matches played in June 2003 in Australia and New Zealand by Wales national rugby union team to prepare the 2003 Rugby World Cup.

Wales lost both test matches.

Matches

Australia vs Wales

New Zealand vs Wales

References 
 
 

2003 rugby union tours
2002–03 in Welsh rugby union
2003
2003 in Australian rugby union
2003 in New Zealand rugby union
2003
2003
History of rugby union matches between New Zealand and Wales
History of rugby union matches between Australia and Wales